Iowa Highway 48 is a  state highway which runs from north to south in southwest Iowa.  It begins at the northern edge of Shenandoah at U.S. Highway 59 and ends at U.S. Highway 6 near Lewis.  The highway has seen few changes since its creation.

Route description

Iowa Highway 48 begins in Shenandoah at an intersection with U.S. Highway 59 (US 59), which serves as the line separating Fremont County and Page County. It heads east for one mile (1.6 km) before turning to the northeast to become parallel to a line of the BNSF Railway. Three miles (4.8 km) east of Essex, Iowa 48 turns north at an intersection with Page County Road J20 (CR J20).

From Red Oak, Iowa 48 continues due north for  until it turns east to cross the East Nishnabotna River and pass through Elliott before turning back to the north. It then travels north for 6 miles to Griswold, where it intersects Iowa 92.

History
Originally, Iowa Highway 48 was a short highway connecting Shenandoah and Red Oak, roughly along the path the route takes today.  By 1952, the route was in its present location and ended at US 6 west of Lewis.  Only the original section had been paved at this time.  By 1976, the entire highway was paved.

Major intersections

References

External links

End of Iowa 48 at Iowa Highway Ends

048